Ice Lake may refer to:

Places
 Ice Lake, Ontario, a lake and a community in Canada
 Ice Lake, New Zealand, in the list of lakes of New Zealand

United States
 Ice Lake (Oregon)
 Ice Lake, in the Ice Lake Basin of Silverton, Colorado
 Ice Lake, Alpine Lakes Wilderness, in the list of lakes in the Alpine Lakes Wilderness, Washington state

Other uses
 Ice Lake (microprocessor)
 Ice Lake, a novel by Trevor Ferguson

See also
 Lake ice, ice on lakes
 Lake ice, in the cryosphere
 Baltic Ice Lake, retreated at the end of the Pleistocene
 Wenham Lake Ice Company, harvested and exported ice from Wenham Lake in Wenham, Massachusetts, US
 Ice Lake Rebels, an American documentary television series
 Glacial lake, a body of water with origins from glacier activity
 Glacial Lake Wisconsin, a prehistoric proglacial lake in the US
 Ice Lake (microprocessor), Intel code name for its 10th-generation Core microprocessor architecture